Frank Schwalba-Hoth (born 12 December 1952 in Hamburg, Germany) is a former politician, founding member of the German Greens, and former MEP. After his graduation from high school (Otto-Hahn-Gymnasium in Geesthacht) and his military service, Frank Schwalba-Hoth studied at the University of Marburg from 1974 to 1981. Frank Schwalba-Hoth has one daughter.

Politics 
Frank Schwalba-Hoth started getting involved in politics as a student, founded the Grün-bunt alternative Liste, the first green student union at a German university and became a member and later President (1979/1980) of the student parliament of Marburg University. He worked on initiatives such as the "3rd International Russell Tribunal on the human rights situation in the Federal Republic of Germany". He became one of the founding members of the German Greens. In 1982 and 1983, Frank Schwalba-Hoth was member of the Landtag of Hesse where his legislative proposal on teacher-training became the first green inspired legislation in a German Parliament ever.

During a reception for US troops stationed in Germany at the Landtag in Hesse he protested the stationing of US nuclear missiles in Germany by spilling his own blood on the medals of the commander of the V US Army Corps, General Paul S Williams.

European Parliament 
Frank Schwalba-Hoth was an MEP from 1984 to 1987, deputy President of the Petitions Committee, in 1986/87 he was one of two Co-Presidents of his political Group in the EP before stepping down because of the rotation principle ("Rotationsprinzip").

Consulting & networking 
Since Frank Schwalba-Hoth left the European Parliament in 1987 he has been a consultant and networker in Brussels. He was director of the Greenpeace liaison office for several years. In 1998 he founded Conseillé+Partners together with Silvana Koch-Mehrin. Later he worked for the TACIS Programme of the European Commission in Central Asia and assisted the ratification process of the Aarhus Convention in Moldova and the Ukraine. Since 2002 he is an independent political analyst and strategist.

Since 1989 Frank Schwalba-Hoth has organised monthly networking events called Soirée Internationale with 60 to 80 participants from different professional, cultural, national and social backgrounds. In 2006, he became a member of the advisory council of the Right Livelihood Award established in 1980 by Jakob von Uexkull. In 2011 and 2012 he published the EU Stakeholder directory, "a 900 page print and online directory of who’s who and what’s where in Brussels".

Since 2013 he is member of the board of directors (conseil d'administration) of the Brussels-based European Quarter Management Fund (EQuAMA).

Since 2014 he is member of the "EU Community Advisory Council" of the web-based newsletter EurActiv.

Since 2015 he is together with Roswitha Fessler-Ketteler, MEP Heidi Hautala, Vytautas Landsbergis and Aleksi Malmberg member of the advisory board of the Caucasian Chamber Orchestra association and its German "Förderverein".

Since 2016 he is member of the Advisory Board of the European Sustainable Cities Summit.

References

External links 
 Soirée Internationale. http://vimeo.com/timeforwords/soiree-internationale
 EP MEP Directory 2012. http://www.europarl.europa.eu/meps/en/1529/Frank_SCHWALBA-HOTH.html
 Archive Depositum Frank Schwalba-Hoth. http://www.europarl.europa.eu/pdf/paad/Introduction%20au%20Repertoire%20Schwalba-Hoth.pdf

Publications 
 Fraktion der Grünen im Hessischen Landtag: Broschüre Die Würde einer Uniform ist antastbar- eine Dokumentation. August 1983.
 Lothar Bembenek; Frank Schwalba-Hoth: Hessen hinter Stacheldraht, verdrängt und vergessen: KZs, Lager, Aussenkommandos, Frankfurt, Eichborn Verlag, 1984.
 Katja Ridderbusch: Der Tross von Brüssel, Wien, Czernin Verlag, 2006. https://web.archive.org/web/20140221053120/http://www.katja-ridderbusch.com/en/author/books
 Frank Schwalba-Hoth: Stakeholder.eu, The Directory for Brussels, Berlin, Lexxion Verlag, 2011 and 2012.

1952 births
Living people
People from Herzogtum Lauenburg
Alliance 90/The Greens MEPs
MEPs for Germany 1984–1989